Elizabeth W. Mburu (born 1968) is a Kenyan theologian who is a professor of New Testament and Greek at the International Leadership University, Africa International University and Pan Africa Christian University in Nairobi. Her book, African Hermeneutics, seeks to provide a uniquely African approach to interpreting the Bible.

Early life and education
Mburu grew up in Nairobi in a family with six children. She is a third generation Christian, and her grandfather was involved in the translation of the Bible into Kikuyu in the early 1900s. Mburu became a Christian herself in 1993 and began to work with street children, leading to a desire for further training.

Mburu has a Master of Divinity from Nairobi International School of Theology and a Master of Sacred Theology from Northwest Baptist Seminary. She received her PhD in New Testament from Southeastern Baptist Theological Seminary (SEBTS) in 2008 with a thesis titled "Qumran and the Origins of Johannine Language and Symbolism", which became her first book. She was the school's first female PhD graduate. While there, she served as managing editor of the seminary's newsletter, Academicus.

Career and research
Mburu taught at Montreat College in the United States before returning to Kenya where she has taught at the Africa International University. She is a curriculum evaluator for the Association of Christian Theological Education in Africa and African regional coordinator and commissioning editor for Langham Literature. She joined the Board of the Africa Bible Commentary in 2017 and was New Testament editor for its revision. She is also on the boards of a number of journals including the South African Baptist Journal of Theology, Conspectus Journal and Pan Africa Christian University Journal.

Mburu's book, African Hermeneutics proposes an intercultural approach that moves from theories, methods and categories familiar to the African world into the world of the Bible, without "taking a detour through any foreign methods". She has said she was motivated to write the book due to the rapid growth of the church in the global South, particularly Africa, a lack of contextual resources available to her students, and the challenges of syncretism. She said her work also "challenges and broadens the lens of Western assumptions and interpretation because it presents Western readers with a different way of looking at texts". Her analogy of a four-legged stool is summarised by Frederick Mawusi Amevenkhu and Isaac Boaheng in their book Biblical Exegesis in African Context as a "suitable model for the African context".

In 2019, Mburu received an Outstanding Academic Achievement Award from SEBTS and gave the keynote address at a celebration held during the 71st annual Evangelical Theological Society meeting.

Selected publications

Books

Chapters

Personal life
Mburu is married to Caxton and they have three children.

References

External links
 Interview with Mburu, Aqueduct Project

Living people
1968 births
People from Nairobi
African biblical scholars
Women Christian theologians
21st-century Protestant theologians
21st-century Kenyan women writers
21st-century Kenyan writers